Xero is an experimental all-girl pornographic film by American director Jack the Zipper and German composer and producer Rockford Kabine.

Description
Xero is an aesthetic and gloomy trip into a world of lesbian erotic, eschaton phantasies and Japanese zen-tradition. It's a movie and musical album of composer and producer Rockford Kabine. The movie derives its effect from the close liaison of pictures and sound. Artistic references are the works of Alejandro Jodorowsky and the Japanese Pink film-exploitation genre, as well as the soundtracks of Ennio Morricone.

Awards
 2011: AVN Award-Nomination: Best All-Girl-Release
 2011: AVN Award-Nomination: Best Art Direction
 2011: AVN Award-Nomination: Best Music Soundtrack
 2011: AVN Award-Nomination: Best Tease Performance (Jayme Langford)
 2011: AltPorn Award: Best Feature AltPorn Video

References

External links 
 
 Xero - Record Of The Week at Aquarius Records (Juli 2010)
 Xero at the 5th Int. Pornfilm Festival Berlin

Alt porn
2010 films
German pornographic films
American avant-garde and experimental films
German independent films
Instrumental soundtracks
2010s pornographic films
2010s avant-garde and experimental films
2010s American films
2010s German films